Edo funk is a musical style from Benin City, Edo State, created in the early 1970s. The Edo Funk music genre  is a cosmopolitan popular dance music with integrating elements from the native Edo culture and fusing them with new sound effects coming from West Africa night-clubs.

Edo Funk's  pioneers and best known exponent is Victor Uwaifo, who has released a series of Edo Funk album recordings starting in the 1970s with other Edo musicians such as Akaba Man,  Osayomore Joseph, Ukodo, Fabomo and Collins Oke. Ekassa and Akwete were also the sub genres of Edo Funk, to interpret the traditional Benin sound.

See also
Victor Uwaifo

References

 Nigerian Edo funk collected on new Analog Africa compilation:  (The Vinyl Factory ), 27 January 2021.

Nigerian styles of music
World music genres
Edo State